Shane O'Neill, 3rd Earl of Tyrone (also known as Seán and, in Spain, Juan, c. 1599 – 29 January 1641) was the youngest son of Hugh O'Neill, Earl of Tyrone.

Early life
He left Ireland with his father and The 1st Earl of Tyrconnell during the Flight of the Earls in September 1607 and went to the European continent. He was considered too young to accompany his father on the journey to Rome and was left in Flanders in the care of his brother Henry. He was educated by Franciscans in Louvain.

Military service
Once old enough, he took up service to the Spanish crown in one of the Irish regiments in Flanders. While there he, like his other O'Neill cousins, constantly planned the return of his father and the restoration of the Gaelic order in Ulster.  He became titular colonel of the Regiment of Tyrone on the death of his half-brother Henry at the request of his father. (O'Neill's cousin Owen Roe O'Neill, although he failed in a bid to assume command of the regiment, later served as second-in-command and acting commander of the regiment until John O'Neill was old enough to assume the role) In 1613 he was at court in Brussels as the page of the Infanta Isabella. After his father died in Rome in 1616, John assumed the title of Earl of Tyrone. His ascent was recognized by both the Pope Urban VIII and the Infanta Isabella of Spain, the Royal Governor of the Spanish Netherlands.  His title, Conde, or Count, was recognised in Spain but no longer in England or Ireland. The title had been granted to his great-grandfather Conn Bacach O'Neill, 1st Earl of Tyrone by Henry VIII of England, and confirmed to his father Hugh by Elizabeth I; it was forfeit by an act of attainder passed by the Irish Parliament in 1608.

A 1625 proposal to the Infanta by Irish expatriates in the Spanish Netherlands, notably Fláithrí Ó Maol Chonaire (anglicised as Florence Conry), then Archbishop of Tuam and O'Neill's cousin, Owen Roe O'Neill for an invasion of Ireland by Spanish forces was rejected; the Archbishop and Owen Roe O'Neill made their way to Madrid to present the plan to the King of Spain, Philip IV of Spain, arriving in 1627. The proposal called for a landing at Killybegs, with the city of Derry to be taken to provide a defensible port. The proposal also called for the Spanish forces to be led by John O'Neill and Hugh O'Donnell, son of Rory O'Donnell, 1st Earl of Tyrconnell who had accompanied his father to Flanders during the Flight of the Earls. To ease tensions between the two families, it was proposed that both were to be appointed as generals of the invasion force and would be considered equals; O'Donnell would be in command of a second Irish regiment created from the existing regiment and the two new regiments would be supplemented with men drawn from other Spanish forces in the Netherlands.

Although a fleet of 11 ships was assembled at Dunkirk, with the fleet anticipated to sail in September 1627, disagreements remained over the composition and leadership of the invasion force. The Infanta in Brussels, wishing to reduce the repercussions to Spain in the event of failure, wanted to reduce the number of Walloons and wished for John O'Neill to be in sole command. while Madrid favoured O'Donnell. The final plan proposed in December 1627 called for the establishment of new Irish parliament and that it would be known that O'Neill and O'Donnell were not undertaking the invasion for personal gain, but for the establishment of a "Kingdom and Republic of Ireland". In the end, the plan was abandoned by the King of Spain.

O'Neill was considered as a threat to English supremacy in Ireland. A 1627 letter from the Lord Deputy of Ireland, Viscount Falkland, claimed evidence existed to the effect that the King of Spain planned to send O'Neill to Ireland at the head of a Spanish army to claim the throne of Ulster for O'Neill himself, and to be proclaimed as governor of Ireland on behalf of the Spanish monarch. (Falkland also claimed that a story was circulating among the Irish that O'Neill had already received a crown of gold, which he kept on a table beside his bed).

John O'Neill approached Philip IV with another proposal for an invasion in 1630; this proposal was rebuffed. During his time in Madrid, O'Neill was made a Knight of Calatrava and a member of the Spanish Supreme Council of War. In 1639, another request by O'Neill to the Spanish king Philip IV that he be allowed lead a Spanish army to Ireland was rejected. In 1641, Rory O'More, unaware of O'Neill's death, sought his assistance for the planned rebellion of 1641.

O'Neill used his influence with the Pope to have his former tutor Aodh Mac Cathmhaoil (anglicised as Hugh MacCaghwell) installed as Archbishop of Armagh and Primate of All Ireland in 1626. In 1630 he founded the College of San Pedro, y San Pablo y San Patricio in Alcala; it closed after his death.

In 1638, the Irish regiments commanded by O'Neill and O'Donnell were transferred from the Army of Flanders to Spain to bolster forces there in the face of an expected French invasion. These regiments were involved in the Spanish attempt to put down the Catalan Revolt. John died in January 1641, leading his regiment during the Battle of Montjuic near Barcelona, dying from a musket-ball wound to his chest near the town of Castelldefels. His regiment suffered catastrophic losses in the engagement. His brother Brian had died two days earlier.

Family
John was born in Dungannon in 1599. His mother was Catherine Magennis, daughter of Sir Hugh Magennis.

While in Madrid after 1630, he met Isabel O'Donnell and they had a child out of wedlock, Hugh Eugene O’Neill, who was later legitimised by the King. (One suggestion to allay tensions between the O'Neills and O'Donnells during the planning of the aborted 1627 invasion was the marriage of John O'Neill to Mary Stuart O’Donnell, the daughter of Hugh Roe O'Donnell, sister of O'Neill's rival Hugh and cousin of Isabel.)

The family tradition of the O'Neills of Martinique is that John also had a legitimate son Patrick, and that John and Patrick both fought with Owen Roe O'Neill in 1642; according to this tradition, Patrick married and settled in Ireland. The Martinique family claims descent from his son Henry, who emigrated at some time during the reign of James II.

Owen Roe O'Neill, the famous Irish General of the 1600s, was asked whether he, upon the death of Shane/John O'Neill, was the Earl of Tyrone. He denied it, saying that the true Earl was Constantino O'Neill, then in Spain. Don Constantino or Conn O'Neill was cousin to both John/Shane and Owen O'Neill through both sides of his family.  His great-grandfather was Conn McShane O'Neill, a son of the famous Prince Shane O'Neill of Ulster, through to his father Art McShane.  His mother Mary, was the daughter of Art MacBaron O'Neill, the brother of Hugh O'Neill, 2nd Earl of Tyrone.  Don Constantino lived in Ireland, but made his way to Spain to claim the title upon the death of his cousin in 1680.  Unfortunately for Constantino, the King, thinking there was no heir, gave the title and command of the Irish regiment to the son of an illegitimate O'Neill cousin.  Constantino went back to Ireland and was an active politician and military officer in the Williamite War as a supporter of King James II.

References 

O'Neill, the Ancient and Royal Family

Flight of the Earls
1599 births
1641 deaths
17th-century Irish people
People from County Tyrone
Irish expatriates in Spain
Irish soldiers in the Spanish Army
O'Neill dynasty
Knights of Calatrava
Earls of Tyrone
Irish chiefs of the name